Michael James de Grey Allingham (born 6 January 1965) is a former Scotland international cricketer and a former Scotland 'B' international rugby union player. He was born at Inverness in 1965.

Cricket career
Allingham played as a right-handed batsman and a right-arm medium-pace bowler. He was and educated at Strathallan School. He played 49 matches for Scotland, including first class, List A, international and ICC Trophy matches.

Rugby Union career
He played as a scrum-half in rugby union for Heriot's. He played provincially for North and Midlands and later played for Edinburgh District. He was capped by the Scotland 'B' side on 28 December 1991 to play against Ireland 'B'.

Allingham retired from rugby following a knee injury.

Professional career
In 2016, he was the head of sport at Edinburgh Academy.

References

External links
 

1965 births
Living people
Commonwealth Games competitors for Scotland
Cricketers at the 1998 Commonwealth Games
Cricketers at the 1999 Cricket World Cup
Cricketers from Inverness
Heriot's RC players
People educated at Strathallan School
Rugby union players from Inverness
Scotland 'B' international rugby union players
Scotland One Day International cricketers
Scottish cricketers
Scottish rugby union players
Rugby union scrum-halves